Lindemann is a German surname.

Persons
Notable people with the surname include:

Arts and entertainment 
 Elisabeth Lindemann, German textile designer and weaver
Jens Lindemann, trumpet player
 Julie Lindemann, American photographer
 Maggie Lindemann, American singer
 Till Lindemann, singer in German NDH-Metal band Rammstein
 Lindemann (band), his side project.

Sports 
 Hannes Lindemann, solo canoeist
 Hermann Lindemann, football player and manager
 Paul Lindemann, basketball player
 Stefan Lindemann, figure skater
 Laura Lindemann, olympic triathlete

Government and military 
 Ernst Lindemann (1894–1941), captain of the German battleship Bismarck
 Ernst Heinrich Lindemann (1833–1900), mayor of Essen, Dortmund and Düsseldorf
 Fritz Lindemann (1894–1944), German artillery officer and member of the resistance to Adolf Hitler
 Gerhard Lindemann (1896–1994), German Generalmajor
 Georg Lindemann (1884–1963), German cavalry officer
 Rosa Lindemann (1876–1958), German communist in the resistance to Nazism

Others 
 Albert Lindemann, American historian 
 Carl Louis Ferdinand von Lindemann, mathematician
 Erich Lindemann, German-American author and psychiatrist
 Erich Lindemann (botanist), German botanist
 Frederick Lindemann, 1st Viscount Cherwell, English physicist, and Churchill's scientific advisor during World War II
 Adolph Friedrich Lindemann, his father; engineer, businessman and amateur astronomer
 George Lindemann, American businessman 
 Margarethe Lindemann, mother of the theologian, Martin Luther

See also
Lindemann mechanism (due to Frederick Lindemann)
Lindeman
Linderman
Lindenbaum

German-language surnames